, also Harukaze no Snegurochka is a  manga by Hiroaki Samura, serialized in Manga Erotics F (Ohta Publishing) from May 2013 to May 2014.

In November 2014 the manga received the Excellence Award in Manga Division at the 18th  Japan Media Arts Festival.

Plot
It is a story of a charming wheelchair girl nicknamed Bielka (means "squirrel" in Russian) and her attendant Shchenok (means "puppy" in Russian) taking place in the severe winter cold of Northern Russia of the emerging Soviet Union of 1933.

References

Fiction set in 1933
2013 manga
Ohta Publishing manga
Seinen manga
Works set in the Soviet Union